Volodymyr Demydovych Lobas (born 6 March 1970 in Kiev) is a Ukrainian football coach and a former player. He is managing FC Merani Martvili.

He played for the main squad of FC Dynamo Kyiv in the USSR Federation Cup.

References

1970 births
Living people
Footballers from Kyiv
Soviet footballers
FC Dynamo Kyiv players
FC Ros Bila Tserkva players
NK Veres Rivne players
Ukrainian footballers
FC Dynamo-2 Kyiv players
FC Nyva Ternopil players
Ukrainian Premier League players
FC CSKA-Borysfen Kyiv players
FC Zhemchuzhina Sochi players
Ukrainian expatriate footballers
Expatriate footballers in Russia
Russian Premier League players
FC Tekstilshchik Kamyshin players
Panserraikos F.C. players
Expatriate footballers in Greece
Acharnaikos F.C. players
Ukrainian football managers
Ukrainian expatriate football managers
Expatriate football managers in Georgia (country)
Association football forwards